Haemoproteus homovelans is a parasite first found in the Grey-faced Woodpecker, Picus canus, in Bulgaria. Haemoproteus homovelans has circumnuclear gametocytes that lack volutin granules. The species is similar to Haemoproteus velans, yet the latter's gametocytes are overfilled with volutin.

References

Further reading
Tostes, Raquel, et al. "Molecular Characterization and Biochemical and Histopathological Aspects of the Parasitism of Haemoproteus spp. in Southern Caracaras (Caracara plancus)." Journal of Parasitology 101.6 (2015): 687–693.
Golemansky, Vassil. "Checklist of Haemosporidian and Piroplasmid Parasites (Apicomplexa: Haemospororida and Pirolasmorida) of Man and Animals in Bulgaria."

Parasites of birds
Haemosporida